Joseph Titus Partridge (9 December 1932 – 6 June 1988) was a Rhodesian cricketer who played in 11 Test matches for South Africa between 1963 and 1965. He formed a potent new-ball partnership with Peter Pollock on the 1963–64 tour of Australia and New Zealand, taking 38 wickets at a bowling average of 28.42 in the eight Test matches. Unusually for a fast bowler, he wore spectacles while playing.

External links
 
 Wisden obituary

1932 births
1988 suicides
Cricketers from Harare
Zimbabwean people of British descent
South Africa Test cricketers
South African cricketers
Rhodesia cricketers
Suicides in Zimbabwe